The Convention Concerning Statistics of Wages and Hours of Work, 1938 is  an International Labour Organization Convention.

It was established in 1938:
Having decided upon the adoption of certain proposals with regard to statistics of wages and hours of work in the principal mining and manufacturing industries, including building and construction, and in agriculture,...

Ratifications
As of 2013, the convention has been ratified by 34 states. Of the ratifying states, 20 have denounced the treaty by means of an automatic process that denounces the 1938 treaty when other superseding conventions are ratified by the same state.

External links 
Text.
Ratifications.

International Labour Organization conventions
Statistical data agreements
Treaties concluded in 1938
Treaties entered into force in 1940
Treaties of Algeria
Treaties of Barbados
Treaties of Chile
Treaties of Cuba
Treaties of Djibouti
Treaties of the Kingdom of Egypt
Treaties of the French Fourth Republic
Treaties of Kenya
Treaties of Myanmar
Treaties of Nicaragua
Treaties of South Africa
Treaties of Tanganyika
Treaties of the United Arab Republic
Treaties of Uruguay
1938 in labor relations